Year 1039 (MXXXIX) was a common year starting on Monday (link will display the full calendar) of the Julian calendar.

Events 
 By place 
 Europe 
 June 4 – Emperor Conrad II (the Elder) dies of gout in Utrecht after a 12-year reign. He is succeeded by his 21-year-old son, Henry III (the Black), who also becomes king of Italy and Burgundy. 
 Duke Casimir I (the Restorer) returns to Poland, and makes great efforts to rebuild the war-ruined country. He establishes his residence at Kraków (which becomes Poland's capital until 1596).

 By topic 
 Religion 
 The Abbey of Bec is founded, located in Le Bec-Hellouin, Normandy (modern France).

Births 
 Helibo, Chinese nobleman and chieftain (d. 1092)
 Minamoto no Yoshiie, Japanese samurai (d. 1106)
 Robert de Stafford, Norman nobleman (approximate date)
 Sancho IV, king of Pamplona (approximate date)
 Su Zhe, Chinese politician and historian (d. 1112)
 Vseslav of Polotsk, Kievan prince (approximate date)

Deaths 
 March 10 – Odo (or Eudes), French nobleman
 April 16 – William III, count of Weimar and Eichsfeld
 May 27 – Dirk III (or Theodoric), count of Holland
 June 4 – Conrad II (the Elder), Holy Roman Emperor
 July 20 – Conrad II (the Younger), duke of Carinthia
 September 19 – Fujiwara no Genshi, empress of Japan (b. 1016) 
 November 4 – Hugh of Chalon, French bishop 
 November 29 – Adalbero, German nobleman
 Abu Nasr Mushkan, Persian statesman (or 1040)
 Iago ab Idwal ap Meurig, prince of Gwynedd
 Nathar Shah, Tamil mystic and preacher (b. 969)
 Regimbald, German abbot and bishop
 Reginar V (or Régnier), French nobleman
 Sophia I, German princess and abbess (b. 975)
 Unsuri, Persian poet and writer (or 1040)

References